The Metropolitan Cathedral of Our Lord's Transfiguration, also known as Palo Metropolitan Cathedral or simply Palo Cathedral, is a Roman Catholic church located at Palo, Leyte, in the Philippines belonging to the Vicariate of Palo under the Metropolitan Archdiocese of Palo.

History

The beginnings of the Jesuit ministry 
In October 1596, the Jesuits, Fr. Cristobal Jimenez, S.J., and Fr. Francisco Encinas, S.J., headed out from Dulag to Palo through traversing the eastern coasts and were accompanied by the leading principales, Don Alonso Ambuyao and four others.

The group arrived at the Bunga River (now the present river of San Joaquin) until they finally entered Ambuyao's house. On the following day, they reached the settlement called Kutay (now, the present site of Palo town proper) located on the bank of the Bangon River. Upon the arrival, the settlement was greatly reduced in population because of a smallpox outbreak, a new disease which was believed to have been brought by the Spaniards.

In 1598, the first church of Palo was built by the Jesuit Father Cristobal Jimenez, S.J., and this was inaugurated on the day of Our Lady (August 15, the feast of the Assumption), one of the most important feasts or devotions by the Jesuit Order, thus dedicating the church to Our Lady. it was also during that time when Fr. Jimenez also solemnized the baptism of a local chieftain named Datu Kanganga of Malirong, whom he baptized as Don Juan Kanganga, and who was appointed as the petty governor of Palo by the Spanish government.

After planting the very first seed of the Christian faith in Palo, the Jesuit doctrine was sustained, and this was taught every day to the children of all the villages and to all adjacent settlements.

By November 1599, Fr. Diego Garcia, S.J., who was commissioned by Rome to make a visitation of the Philippine Vice-Province arrived in Tinago, Samar, and proceeded to the mission-stations in Leyte, which ended up in a Jesuit conference of both island-provinces in Palo. Twenty-six Jesuits attended the conference, which began on January 6, 1600. The result of the conference was reducing the many provinces into three: Carigara, Dulag and Alangalang.

In the beginning, Palo was just a visita under the Jesuit Residence of Dulag. In 1613, after the raid of the Joloan invaders, the residencia was transferred to Dagami. It has given the jurisdictions over the missions of Malaguicay (now, Tanauan), Malirong (now, Brgy. Libertad, a present barangay of Palo) and Banayon, including Palo.

Years later, Palo would be the seat of the Jesuit central residence because of its strategic location. Jesuit reports would reveal that the Jesuit central residence was already in Palo by the 1700s but was officially named only to Dagami. It remained under the administration of the Jesuits until their expulsion in 1768.

The following are the Jesuit missionaries who have served Palo beginning at the time when an operarius (a priest in-charge) was assigned:

 1695–1698: Pedro Vello, S.J.
 1698–1714: Mauricio Pereira, S.J.
 1714–1721: Pedro Farriz, S.J.
 1721–1728: Martin Gil, S.J.
 1728–1732: Pedro Estrada, S.J.
 1732–1735: Bartolommeo Lugo, S.J.
 1735–1739: Juan de Eguia, S.J.
 1739–1748: Emmanuel Herrero, S.J.
 1748–1749: Angelo Brescia, S.J.
 1749–1754: Bartolommeo Lugo, S.J.
 1754–1760: Roque Corbino, S.J.
 1760–1768: Juan Miguel dela Cuesta, S.J.

The Augustinian years 
In 1768, the Jesuit missionaries who labored the two island-provinces of Samar and Leyte and other islands in the Visayas were expelled by King Charles III of Spain by virtue of the royal order called the pragmatic sanction. The pope also declared his bull of expulsion. (See Suppression of the Society of Jesus).

Palo became under the administration of the Augustinian friars, who inherited the stone church built by the Jesuits. the first Augustinian friar who arrived Palo was Fray Matias Rosel, O.S.A., who came from Andalusia, Spain. The erudite Augustinian fray Agustin Maria de Castro, O.S.A., described the pueblo of Palo as having six hundred tribute payers. The church is beautiful and very furnished with carved silver and ornaments and is dedicated to La Transfiguracion del Senor Jesucristo. It has also a good house (convent) and surrounded stone wall prepared with good weaponries. He also said that the town has much wine (tuba) and coconut oil. The townspeople raised many pigs and chickens, and they trade in the sea.

Some of the priests who have served the Parish of Palo during the Augustinian times were

 R. P. Fray Matias Rosel, O.S.A. in 1768
 R. P. Fray Ignacio Callazo, O.S.A. in 1774
 R. P. Fray Lorenzo Molina, O.S.A. in 1788
 R. P. Fray Andres Carpintero, O.S.A. in 1796

Due to the scarcity of the Augustinianfriars, the church was given temporarily under the administration of the secular clergy of the Diocese of Cebu.

 Presbitero Don Apolinario Damian (1804–1808)
 Presbitero Don Adriano del Castillo (1808–1826)
 Presbitero Don Ignacio del Castillo (1826–1843)
 Presbitero Don Francisco Paula de Villasis (1843–1844)

The coming of the Franciscans 
In 1843, the Augustinians bequeathed the parish church of Palo to the Franciscans through a royal decree dated October 29, 1837. The first Franciscan parish priest who was assigned to Palo was Fray Baldomero Baena, O.F.M.

In 1850, Fray Agustin Consuegra, O.F.M., roofed the stone church. The church measures 180 feet long and 60 feet wide. At the corners of the main doorway were two thick pillars and constructed the two bell towers. The parish convento of stone, which was built by the Jesuits, was roofed by Fr. Consuegra. He was the one who repaired the choir loft of the church. He also added a new baptistery made of stone surrounded by great yard that faces the church.

In 1865, Fray Juan Perez, O.F.M., was the one who built the spacious cemetery with stone walls, a chapel and a morgue. In 1892, the church was expanded by Fray Pantaleon dela Fuente, O.F.M. The convent was enlarged, and in 1896 he placed on the facade of the church a clock and a barometer of colossal proportions made by Jose de Altonaga.

It was also said that the Church of Palo was visited by Monsignor Martin Alcocer y Garcia, O.F.M, then Bishop of Cebu, in 1892 to solemnize confirmation rites for the parishioners. Whenever he came, all the streets of the town were carpeted with bright colored tikug mats spread on the streets for his feet to tread upon, as he alighted from the carriage that bore him from Tacloban to the Palo bridge.

When a strong typhoon of 1897 hit Palo, the church was unroofed. However, prior to that Palo had undergone such destructions like fire and strong typhoons that deteriorated the church building.

Some of the priests who have served the parish church of Palo during the time of the Franciscan friars were

 1844–1847 R. P. Fray Baldomero Baena, O.F.M.

Presbitero Don Francisco Paula de Villasis (cuadjutor, 1844–1845)

 1847–1857 R. P. Fray Agustin de Consuegra, O.F.M.
 1857–1858 Presbitero Don Leon Continelever (secular clergy)
 1858–1861 R. P. Fray Leon Tellez de Temblegue, O.F.M.
 1861–1879 R. P. Fray Juan Perez, O.F.M.
 1879–1879 Presbitero Don Isidro Aquino y Gomez (secular clergy)
 1879–1882 R. P. Fray Florentino Garcia, O.F.M.
 1882–1885 R. P. Fray Sebastian de Almonacid, O.F.M.
 1885–1886 R. P. Fray Pedro Ruiz, O.F.M.
 1886–1887 R. P. Fray Gil Martinez, O.F.M.
 1887–1898 R. P. Fray Pantaleon de la Fuente, O.F.M.

The hermanidad and devotion to Señor Salvador 
Since the Jesuit times, the patron of Palo is Señor San Salvador – The Transfigured Christ. This devotion was passed down to the inhabitants of Palo until the time of the Augustinians when the hermanidad was formed with the secular parish priest at that time, Fr. Ignacio del Castillo, serving as the first Hermano Mayor in 1830. This was later succeeded by the following hermanos like Don Wenceslao Estopa (1844–1850), Don Gregorio Moraleda (1851–1856), Don Paulino Montejo (1857–1861), Don Manuel Mora (1880–1885), Don Anastacio Acebedo (1886–1893), Don Alejandro Flores (1894–1900) and many others.

A period of transition 
In 1898, the first Philippine Republic was proclaimed in Kawit, Cavite. The Spaniards and the Spanish-friars were requested to leave the country and give the parishes to the secular Filipino priests.

General Emilio Aguinaldo appointed General Ambrosio Mojica, a Caviteño, as politico-military governor of the province of Leyte. In 1899, for the second time, Palo was created as the capital seat and of politico-military government of General Mojica. Presbitero Don Fabian Avelino succeeded Fray Pantaleon de la Fuente, O.F.M.

An era of the church's secularization 
After Fr. Agustin Medalle tenure as parish priest, the parochial administration of the church was passed down to Juan Pacoli, a native of Paranas, Samar. He would later become the longest-serving parish priest of Palo (1899–1938). He managed the transition of the administration of the church from the Franciscan friars to the secular clergy of the Diocese of Cebu.

When the Diocese of Calbayog was created in 1910. the Church of Palo became the scene of two diocesan synods in 1911 when it was convoked by Msgr. Pablo Singzon de la Annunciacion, the first Bishop of Calbayog, and in 1935 during the time of Bishop Sofronio Hacbang. Also during that year, Ambrose Agius, O.S.B., who was then the Apostolic Delegate to the Philippines and the representative of the pope, visited the church of Palo. Later, Archbishop Giuseppe Petrelli, another Apostolic Delegate to the Philippines, also came to visit the parish.

In 1926, the large rectory served as the first apostolic and minor seminary under Fr. Consorcio Poblete, a native of Gandara, Samar.

On June 27, 1927, Archbishop Guglielmo Piani, S.D.B., visited the church of Palo, and later, American Archbishop of Manila, Michael O'Doherty.

Here are the following diocesan secular clergy who have served the parish Church of Palo from the period of the transition from 1898 to the present:

The parish priests of Palo (1898–present) 
 1898–1899: Fabian Avelino
 1899-1899: Agustin Medalle
 1899–1938: Juan Pacoli
 1938–1946: Lino R. Gonzaga
 1946–1949: Lesmes Ricalde
 1949–1950: Lino R. Gonzaga
 1950–1951: Zenon Ocampo
 1951–1952: Climaco Faelnar
 1952–1960: Zenon Ocampo
 1960–1962: Cipriano V. Urgel
 1962-1962: Aluino Estalilia
 1962–1968: Estanislao Abarca
 1968–1971: Felimon Quiazon
 1971–1974: Bartolome "Bart" Pastor
 1974–1977: Estanislao A. Abarca, P.A.
 1977–1987: Leonardo Y. Medroso (appointed, Bishop of Borongan in 1987)
 1987–1989: Estanislao A. Abarca, P.A.
 1989–1994: Pastor E. Cotiangco, P.C.
 1994–2001: Benidicto B. Catilogo, P.C.
 2001–2004: Stephen R. Pesado
 2004–2007: Benjamin M. Bacierra, P.A., S.Th.D.
 2007–2010: Ramon Stephen B. Aguilos, P.C., S.Th.D., M.S.E.M.
 2010–2014: Bernardo R. Pantin, P.C.,J.C.D. (appointed CBCP Secretary General in 2014.)
 2014–2017: Rex Cullingham Ramirez, S.L.L. (appointed, Bishop of Naval in 2017 by Pope Francis)
 2017–2021: Gilbert G. Urbina, S.Th.D., S.L.L. (appointed Vicar General in 2021)
 2021–present: Rodolfo P. Barro

From pueblo to sede 
Twenty-seven years later, on November 28, 1937, Palo was separated from its mother diocese, Calbayog and was elevated into a separate diocese comprising the whole province of Leyte by virtue of apostolic decree Si Qua in Urbe issued by Pope Pius XI. On March 25, 1938, the church was declared a cathedral, and Msgr. Manuel Mascariñas became its first bishop.

The local shepherds of Palo (1937–1982) 
 1937–1951: Manuel Mascarinas, D.D.
 1951–1966: Lino R. Gonzaga, D.D.
 1967–1969: Teotimo C. Pacis, C.M., D.D.
 1970–1973: Manuel S. Salvador, D.D.
 1973–1982: Cipriano V. Urgel, D.D.

World War II and post-war period: An era of challenge, rehabilitation and development 
The Pacific War in the Philippines began on December 8, 1941, when Japanese Forces started bombing Manila. Later, they arrived and occupied Leyte. From 1942, the annual fiesta continued until 1944. When the American liberated Leyte Island through the Battle of Leyte Gulf, the cathedral of Palo was used by the American Liberation Forces as a hospital for war casualties from October 20, 1944, to March 7, 1945.

After the war, Bishop Lino Gonzaga decided to expand and renovate the cathedral because of the town's growing population. It was in the 1960s when the massive work was started under the direction of Manuel Martin. The work of the modern cathedral was continued until the grand celebration of the diamond jubilee of Palo as a diocese in 2012.

The new Metropolitan Archdiocese of Palo 
On November 15, 1982, the Diocese of Palo was made into a metropolitan archdiocese with four suffragan dioceses: the Dioceses of Catarman, Calbayog, Borongan and Maasin.

The Diocese of Maasin was erected on March 23, 1968, while the Diocese of Naval was made on November 29, 1988.

The Archbishops of Palo:

 Archbishop Cipriano V. Urgel D.D. (1982–1985)
 Archbishop Pedro R. Dean, D.D. (1985–2006)
 Archbishop Jose S. Palma, O.P., D.D. (2006–2010)
 Archbishop John Forrosuelo Du, D.D. (2012–present)

In November 2013, the cathedral was damaged by Typhoon Haiyan. After Haiyan's havoc, a memorial service for the typhoon's casualties was held in the cathedral. Bodies were buried in the cathedral's grave site. On Christmas Eve, Pope Francis sent his Apostolic Nuncio to the country, Giuseppe Pinto, to lead a Mass at the roofless cathedral and to inspect the damage on churches in Eastern Visayas. After the church's rehabilitation, Pope Francis briefly visited the cathedral in January 2015, brought about by impending Tropical Storm Mekkhala. In 2015, it was declared as one of the pilgrim churches of the archdiocese by Archbishop John F. Du.

Gallery

References

Roman Catholic churches in Leyte (province)
Roman Catholic cathedrals in the Philippines